The Atlantic City Bus Terminal is a regional bus station and a major stop for New Jersey Transit buses in Atlantic City, New Jersey. Located at the 1900 block of Atlantic Avenue, the station is now only half its original size, as part of it was carved out for a Polo Ralph Lauren store along the Atlantic City Outlets The Walk. The terminal contains vending machines, restrooms, a seating area, and ticket offices for New Jersey Transit. Opened, in 1997, the bus terminal replaced the Atlantic City Union Station where buses have been stopping since 1964, which then has ceased usage of passenger trains. The old Union Station was demolished in 1997 when the bus terminal was opened. Until late October 2022, Greyhound Bus Lines also served the terminal. The Atlantic City Convention Center and Rail Terminal is located three blocks away.

Destinations

New Jersey Transit
319 to Toms River and New York City, or Wildwood and Cape May via the Garden State Parkway
501 to Brigantine
551 to Sicklerville, Camden and Philadelphia via the Atlantic City Expressway
552 to Cape May Court House, Wildwood, and Cape May via the Garden State Parkway
553 to Vineland and Bridgeton via Mays Landing
554 to Lindenwold via the White Horse Pike
559 to Lakewood via Route 9

External links
NJ Transit official site
Greyhound official site

Buildings and structures in Atlantic City, New Jersey
Bus transportation in New Jersey
NJ Transit bus stations
Transportation buildings and structures in Atlantic County, New Jersey
Transit hubs serving New Jersey